Zavar is a village and municipality of Trnava District in the Trnava region of Slovakia. One of the main employers in the village is an auto industry production branch. Zavar location at a crossroad of D1 and R1 motorways is a good prerequisite for the further development. According to 2021 census, more than 15% of inhabitants are foreigners, mostly Ukrainians and Serbians.

References

External links

 Official page
 https://web.archive.org/web/20071027094149/http://www.statistics.sk/mosmis/eng/run.html
 http://en.e-obce.sk/obec/zavar/zavar.html

Villages and municipalities in Trnava District